Blake Hood is an American actor. His best known roles include Mark Driscoll on The CW's 90210 and Kyle Abbott on the CBS Daytime soap opera The Young and the Restless.

Filmography

References

External links
 

21st-century American male actors
American male film actors
American male soap opera actors
American male television actors
Living people
1985 births